Nandkar Koliwada is a village in the Thane district of Maharashtra, India. It is located in the Bhiwandi taluka. The Bhatsa River joins the Kalu River (a tributary of Ulhas River near this village.

Demographics 

According to the 2011 census of India, Nandkar has 325 households. The effective literacy rate (i.e. the literacy rate of population excluding children aged 6 and below) is 78.6%.

References 

Villages in Bhiwandi taluka